Intercultural Universities in Mexico are higher education institutions which were established in 2004 in response to the lack of enrollment of the indigenous population in Mexico. While an estimated 10% of the population of Mexico is indigenous, it is the least represented in higher education. According to estimates, only between 1% and 3% of higher education enrollment in Mexico is indigenous. In response to this inequality, the General Coordination for Intercultural and Bilingual Education at the Ministry of Education established Intercultural Universities with the active participation of indigenous organizations and academic institutions in each region. These institutions are located in densely indigenous areas and, though they allow for diversity in enrollment, they are especially intended for the indigenous population. Founded on the principle of intercultural education, they aim to foster dialogue between different cultures and represent a way of responding to both the historical and more recent demands of indigenous peoples.

In congruence with the recognition of diversity, Intercultural Universities do not propose a fixed approach to their educational activities. While assuring the respect of some basic principles, each university defines its curriculum according to the needs and potentials of the region in which it is located. Students are engaged in activities that relate them to the surrounding communities through research and development projects, with the aim of working and contributing to the development of their territory, their people and their culture. Twelve Intercultural Universities are currently operating with a total enrollment of approximately 7,000 students and a high proportion of female students. Despite the challenges of financing, of students' living conditions and of political vulnerability that these universities face, they represent an important contribution to the achievement of educational equity.

List of intercultural universities
Universidad Autónoma Intercultural de Sinaloa
Universidad Intercultural de Chiapas
Universidad Intercultural del Estado de Guerrero
Universidad Intercultural del Estado de México
Universidad Intercultural del Estado de Puebla
Universidad Intercultural del Estado de Tabasco
Universidad Intercultural Indígena de Michoacán
Universidad Intercultural Maya de Quintana Roo
Universidad Veracruzana Intercultural
Universidad Intercultural de San Luis Potosí
Universidad Intercultural de Hidalgo
Universidad Intercultural de Nayarit

See also 
 Education in Mexico
 Intercultural competence
 Intercultural relations
 Interculturalism

Sources

References 

Education in Mexico
Interculturalism
Educational institutions established in 2004
Types of university or college
Indigenous education
2004 establishments in Mexico